Blackett or Blacket is a surname of English derivation.

People
 Andrea Blackett (born 1976), Barbadian athlete
 Basil Phillott Blackett (1882–1935), British civil servant and finance expert
 Basil Blackett (1886–1920), British WW1 flying ace
Christopher Blackett, British colliery and newspaper owner and railway innovator
 Edmund Blacket (1817–1883), Australian architect
Hill Blackett (1892–1967), American radio advertising pioneer
 Blackett baronets
Sir William Blackett, 1st Baronet, of Matfen (1620–1680), businessman and MP
Sir Edward Blackett, 2nd Baronet of Matfen (1649–1718), MP, builder of Newby Hall
Sir Edward Blackett, 3rd Baronet (1683–1756), Royal Navy officer
Sir Edward Blackett, 4th Baronet of Matfen (1719–1804), MP
Sir William Blackett, 1st Baronet, of Newcastle (1657–1705), MP
Sir William Blackett, 2nd Baronet of Newcastle (1690–1728), MP
 Calverley-Blackett baronets
Sir Walter Blackett, 2nd Baronet (born Calverley), MP
Jamie Blackett (born 1964), British politician, landowner, author and freelance columnist
Jeff Blackett (born 1955), British Royal Navy office and judge
John Fenwick Burgoyne Blackett (1821–1856), British politician
John Erasmus Blackett (1729–1814), British businessman and Mayor of Newcastle
John Blackett (1818–1893), New Zealand engineer
Lee Blackett (born 1982), English rugby player and coach
Lindsay Blackett (born 1961), Canadian politician
Mary Dawes Blackett (fl. 1786-1791), British writer 
Patrick Blackett, Baron Blackett (1897–1974), British experimental physicist, Nobel Prize winner
Ralph Beattie Blacket (1919–2010), Australian physician
Shane Blackett (born 1982), English footballer
Tyler Blackett (born 1994), English footballer
Vivien Blackett (born 1955), English artist
Blackett of Wylam, a family

Fictional characters
 Nancy Blackett and Peggy Blackett, Swallows and Amazons
 Sergeant Blackitt, Z-Cars

Further reading

External links

The Blacketts of North East England

English-language surnames